Patel Para is one of the neighbourhoods of Jamshed Town in Karachi, Sindh, Pakistan.

Before the independence of Pakistan in 1947, there was a substantial population of Patel Hindus, Parsis and Ismailis who lived in the area now known as Patel Para. “Whenever any Hindu died and had unclaimed property, the Patels would automatically become the custodians of that property. At that time, Patels in that area were in a majority, and thus this area became Patel Para. After the independence of Pakistan, nearly all Hindus migrated to India in 1947.

There are several ethnic groups including Muhajirs, Punjabis, Sindhis, Kashmiris, Seraikis, Pakhtuns, Balochis, Memons, Bohras, Ismailis and Christians.

References

External links 
 Karachi Website.

Neighbourhoods of Karachi
Jamshed Town